The following highways are numbered 422:

Canada
  Manitoba Provincial Road 422
  Newfoundland and Labrador Route 422

Japan
 Route 422 (Japan)

United States
  Interstate 422 (future)
  U.S. Route 422
  Georgia State Route 422 (unsigned designation for Georgia State Route 10 Loop)
  Louisiana Highway 422
  Maryland Route 422
  New York State Route 422 (former)
  Oregon Route 422
  Oregon Route 422S
  Puerto Rico Highway 422
  Tennessee State Route 422
  Texas State Highway Spur 422

See also
 Special routes of U.S. Route 422